Edwin Henry Boddington (1836–1905?) was an English landscape painter during the Victorian era, and a member of the Williams family of painters.

He was born in Islington, the son of the well-known landscape painter Henry John Boddington, and he learned to paint from his father. Boddington exhibited at the Royal Academy (11 works), the British Institution (25 works), and Suffolk Street (45 works). He painted mainly views on the Thames River that are illuminated either by sunset or moonlight. Most of his river scenes are painted in very dark greens and browns, and many resemble some of the earlier works of his father.
In the early 1860s, he lived with his wife Helena, also an artist, in Merrow, Surrey.

He is thought to have died about 1905, possibly in Australia where his sons Percy Reginald Boddington (1866-1936) and Henry Frederick Boddington (1870-1940) had emigrated. Examples of his work hang in the Glasgow Museum, Rotherham Museum, Reading Town Hall and the Ealing Central Library.

Notes

References

External links
Edwin Henry Boddington Biography on J.M. Stringer Gallery
Paintings by Edwin Henry Boddington in British Museums on Art UK

1839 births
19th-century English painters
English male painters
20th-century English painters
Landscape artists
Year of death missing
19th-century English male artists
20th-century English male artists